Portumna Abbey is a medieval Cistercian (and later Dominican) friary and National Monument located in Portumna, Ireland.

Location

History

A chapel dedicated to Saints Peter and Paul was founded by Cistercian monks in 1254, dependent on Dunbrody Abbey, County Wexford.

The Cistercian foundation declined and was replaced with a Dominican friary dedicated to Saint Mary Assumed into Heaven, Peter and Paul, founded in 1426 by Murchad Ó Madáin of the powerful O'Madden lords of Síol Anmchadha.

Portumna was dissolved c. 1582 and granted to Ulick Burke, 3rd Earl of Clanricarde.

The friary was reestablished in 1640, with Ambrose Ó Madadhan the first prior. Richard Ó Madadhan was prior in 1691, when the friars were forced to flee after the Battle of Aughrim. Anthony McHugo was the prior when the Dominicans were formally expelled on 1 May 1698. Some remained and by the early 18th century they had reoccupied the priory. McHugo died there on 24 July 1711. The friars continued to live in the area, at Boula and at Gortanumera up to the 19th century.

Part of the monastery was used as a Church of Ireland church in 1631. Patrick Sarsfield, 1st Earl of Lucan married Honora Burke here on 9 January 1689, in the midst of the War of the Two Kings.

The choir was the local Church of Ireland place of worship between 1762 and 1810.

Buildings

There is a large collection of medieval graveslabs and memorial plaques, and a piscinal.

On the northern side is a cloister and sacristy, with some of the arcade reconstructed.

References

External links

Cistercian monasteries in the Republic of Ireland
Dominican monasteries in the Republic of Ireland
Religion in County Galway
Archaeological sites in County Galway
National Monuments in County Galway
1254 establishments in Europe
1426 establishments in Europe